Central Lincolnshire is the name given to a region of Lincolnshire in the East Midlands, England. The area covers the districts of North Kesteven and West Lindsey as well as the City of Lincoln. The name is used for the planning and development of a part of Lincolnshire surrounding Lincoln, North Hykeham, Sleaford, Market Rasen, Caistor and Gainsborough as well as other outlying villages and hamlets.

Area
Central Lincolnshire was designated to help with the growing population, demand for developments, and planning permission for developments for specific towns and villages in North Kesteven, Lincoln and West Lindsey. Most of the area between Lincoln and North Hykeham is urbanized with North Hykeham, Bracebridge, and part of Waddington built up to the boundary between Lincoln and North Kesteven. Other outlying villages surrounding Lincoln which act as commuter villages for the city and surrounding towns include:

 Aubourn
 Boothby Graffoe
 Branston
 Burton
 Burton Waters
 Canwick
 Cherry Willingham
 Coleby
 Doddington
 Fiskerton
 Greetwell
 Harmston
 Heighington
 Navenby
 Nettleham
 North Greetwell
 Reepham
 Riseholme
 Saxilby
 Skellingthorpe
 South Hykeham
 Sudbrooke
 Thorpe-on-the-Hill
 Washingborough
 Wellingore
 Whisby
 Witham St Hughs'''

Built-up areas
The area icovers the following built-up areas:

 Caistor - (2,489)
 Gainsborough - (20,842) - covers Gainsborough and Morton.
 Lincoln - (114,879) - covers Bracebridge, Lincoln, North Hykeham and Waddington.
 Market Rasen - (4,773)
 Sleaford - (17,359) - covers Quarrington and Sleaford.

References

External links 
 Local gov

Geography of Lincolnshire